Kowale may refer to the following places in Poland:
Kowale, Łódź Voivodeship (central Poland)
Kowale, Lower Silesian Voivodeship (south-west Poland)
Kowale, Masovian Voivodeship (east-central Poland)
Kowale, Opole Voivodeship (south-west Poland)
Kowale, Białystok County in Podlaskie Voivodeship (north-east Poland)
Kowale, Bielsk County in Podlaskie Voivodeship (north-east Poland)
Kowale, Sokółka County in Podlaskie Voivodeship (north-east Poland)
Kowale, Gdańsk County in Pomeranian Voivodeship (north Poland)
Kowale, Kartuzy County in Pomeranian Voivodeship (north Poland)
Kowale, Kwidzyn County in Pomeranian Voivodeship (north Poland)
Kowale, Cieszyn County in Silesian Voivodeship (south Poland)
Kowale, Częstochowa County in Silesian Voivodeship (south Poland)
Kowale, Warmian-Masurian Voivodeship (north Poland)